Mattias Jorstedt is a Swedish former professional  Magic: The Gathering player and poker player. He is most famous for winning Pro Tour Yokohama in 2003 and the fact that he during the 2002-2003 season reached three Pro Tour top eights, winning one, and still only finished second in the player of the year-race 16 points behind winner Kai Budde. Around Scandinavia Jorstedt is also famous for winning the first ever Nordic Championship of Magic held in Denmark in the year 2000.

Achievements

References

Living people
Swedish Magic: The Gathering players
People from Gothenburg
Year of birth missing (living people)